Michael Walker (13 August 1885 – 17 March 1971) was an Irish cyclist. He represented Great Britain as a member of the Ireland team in two events at the 1912 Summer Olympics. He was Irish champion at 50 miles in 1913 and set national records at both 12 and 24 hours.

With his brother John Walker, also an Olympic cyclist, he fought in the 1916 Rising for Irish independence. He was a member of the Irish Volunteers, 2nd Battalion, Jacob's Garrison, under the command of Thomas MacDonagh. He was subsequently imprisoned in H.M.P. Stafford, but later returned to Ireland to fight in the War of Independence.

References

External links
 

1885 births
1971 deaths
British male cyclists
Irish male cyclists
Olympic cyclists of Great Britain
Cyclists at the 1912 Summer Olympics
Sportspeople from Dublin (city)
Olympic cyclists of Ireland